Escape of the Artful Dodger is an Australian children's television series first screened on the Nine Network in 2001.

Escape of the Artful Dodger is the story of Jack Dawkins,  who was introduced in the classic Charles Dickens novel Oliver Twist. The Artful Dodger is a fast-talking, nimble-fingered young pick-pocket in London, whose voyage to Australia presents an opportunity to escape from his old life of being a crook, to become a hero.

Plot
Having been deported to Australia along with fellow crook, Will Grady while Oliver Twist and Hannah Schuller are on their way to join up with Hannah's brother, Michael, Dodger and his new friends find themselves facing obstacles along the way, namely, the tyranny and cruelty of the corrupt officer, Sergeant Bates.

Cast
 Luke O'Loughlin as Dodger
 Rowan Witt as Oliver Twist
 Brittany Byrnes as Hannah Schuller
 Simon Scarlett as Wild Will Grady
 Barry Langrishe as Sergeant Bates
 Mathew Waters as Scratch
 Henri Szeps as Dr. Hartman
 Phillip Hinton as Mr. Brownlow
 Maggie Blinco as Mrs Posset
 Kate Sherman as Becky
 Christopher Baz as Fagin
 Bill Conn as Mr Butterfield
 Aurora Voss as Kelly
 Shane Briant as Colonel Springs
 Richard Wilson as Lord Edward Tuxley

See also
 List of Australian television series

References

External links

Aus TV Site

2001 Australian television series debuts
2001 Australian television series endings
Australian children's television series
Nine Network original programming
Television shows based on Oliver Twist
2000s children's television series
Television series about orphans